The Communauté de communes du Grand Roye is a communauté de communes in the Somme département and in the Hauts-de-France région of France. It was created on 1 January 2012, and the former Communauté de communes du canton de Montdidier was merged into it on 1 January 2017. It consists of 62 communes, and its seat is in Montdidier. Its area is 396.7 km2, and its population was 25,626 in 2018, of which 6,174 in Montdidier and 5,709 in Roye.

Composition
The communauté de communes consists of the following 62 communes:

Andechy
Armancourt
Assainvillers
Ayencourt
Balâtre
Becquigny
Beuvraignes
Biarre
Bouillancourt-la-Bataille
Boussicourt
Bus-la-Mésière
Cantigny
Le Cardonnois
Carrépuis
Champien
Courtemanche
Crémery
Cressy-Omencourt
Damery
Dancourt-Popincourt
Davenescourt
L'Échelle-Saint-Aurin
Erches
Ercheu
Étalon
Ételfay
Faverolles
Fescamps
Fignières
Fonches-Fonchette
Fontaine-sous-Montdidier
Fresnoy-lès-Roye
Goyencourt
Gratibus
Grivillers
Gruny
Guerbigny
Hattencourt
Herly
Laboissière-en-Santerre
Laucourt
Liancourt-Fosse
Lignières
Malpart
Marché-Allouarde
Marestmontiers
Marquivillers
Mesnil-Saint-Georges
Montdidier
Piennes-Onvillers
Remaugies
Roiglise
Rollot
Roye
Rubescourt
Saint-Mard
Tilloloy
Trois-Rivières
Verpillières
Villers-lès-Roye
Villers-Tournelle
Warsy

References 

Roye
Roye